Colvin Creek is a stream in Oregon and Ripley counties of the Ozarks of southern Missouri. It is a tributary of the Eleven Point River.

Colvin Creek has the name of the local Colvin family.

See also
List of rivers of Missouri

References

Rivers of Oregon County, Missouri
Rivers of Ripley County, Missouri
Rivers of Missouri